KCB Bank Tanzania Limited, also KCB Bank Tanzania, is a commercial bank in Tanzania. It is one of the twenty-nine (29) banks licensed by the Bank of Tanzania, the country's banking regulator. The bank is a member of the Kenya Commercial Bank Group (KCB Group), headquartered in Nairobi, Kenya, with subsidiaries in Kenya, Rwanda, South Sudan, Tanzania and Uganda.

External links
 Website of KCB (Tanzania)
 Website of Kenya Commercial Bank Group
 Website of Bank of Tanzania

See also
 List of banks in Tanzania
 KCB Group
 Bank of Tanzania

References

Banks of Tanzania
Companies of Tanzania
Economy of Dar es Salaam
Kenya–Tanzania relations
KCB Group